C. cyaneus may refer to:
 Ceanothus cyaneus, the San Diego buckbrush or lakeside ceanothus, a flowering plant species found in California and Baja California
 Circus cyaneus, the hen harrier or Northern harrier, a bird of prey species that breeds throughout the northern parts of the northern hemisphere
 Copadichromis cyaneus, a fish species found in Malawi, Mozambique and Tanzania

See also